The 2019 Triglav osiguranje Radivoj Korać Cup was the 17th season of the Serbian men's national basketball cup tournament. The tournament was held in Niš from 14–17 February 2019.

Qualified teams

1 League table position after 13 rounds played

Venue

Draw 
The draw was held in the Hyatt Regency hotel in Belgrade on 31 January 2019.

Bracket

Quarterfinals

FMP v Sveti Đorđe

Partizan NIS v Novi Pazar

Mega Bemax v Borac

Crvena zvezda mts v Dynamic VIP PAY

Semifinals

FMP v Partizan NIS

Crvena zvezda mts v Mega Bemax

Final

See also
2018–19 Basketball Cup of Serbia
2018–19 Basketball League of Serbia
2018 ABA League Supercup
2018–19 Milan Ciga Vasojević Cup

References

External links
 Official website  
 Competitions in Basketball Federation of Serbia 

Radivoj Korać Cup
Radivoj
Serbia